The Deal may refer to:

Film and television
 The Deal (1983 film), an Argentine film
 The Deal (2003 film), a political television-film directed by Stephen Frears
 The Deal (2005 film), a political thriller starring Christian Slater
 The Deal (2008 film), a satirical comedy starring William H. Macy
 The Deal (2015 film), a South Korean film
 The Debt (2015 film), also known as Oliver's Deal or The Deal
 "The Deal" (Seinfeld), a 1991 episode of the TV series
 "The Deal" (The Americans), an episode of the TV series
 The Deal (Japanese game show), the Japanese franchise of the game show Deal or No Deal
 The Deal (U.S. TV program), a 2008–2010 American rap music video television program that aired on BET

Other
 The Deal (album), by American post-metal band Sumac
 The Deal (magazine), a group of finance publications
 "The Deal", a song from the musical, Chess

See also
 Deal (disambiguation)